Terra a Terra is a band from Portugal.

Discography

Albums
 1980 «Dançando pulirando»
 Dançando pulirando
 Luisinha
 Não se me dá que vindimem
 Raparigas, cantai todas!
 Primavera
 Pingacho
 Chula de Carreço
 Malhão de Mira
 Diabos levem os ratos
 Segadinhas
 No alto daquela serra
 Santiago Sentissima Grande
 Tanta silva, tanta amora
 1981 «Pelo toque da viola»
 O rapaz do casaquito (Minho)
 Pelo toque da viola (Baixo Alentejo)
 Chula rabela (Alto Douro)
 Olha o passarinho! (Baixo Alentejo)
 Gallandum (Trás-os-Montes)
 Triste malhão (Beira Alta)
 Que queres te eu traga? (Açores)
 Vá de binga (Beira Baixa)
 Sete varas tem (Trás-os-Montes)
 Pêras e pão (Beira Alta)
 Mariana (Beira Baixa)
 Tirana, atira! (Açores)
1983 – Estilhaços
1984 – Lá Vai Jeremias
1998 – O Melhor dos Melhores (Compilation)
2000 – Clássicos da Renascença (Compilation)

External links
https://edwardbetts.com/find_link?q=Terra_a_Terra

Portuguese musical groups